S49 may refer to:
 County Route S49 (Bergen County, New Jersey)
 Ikarus S-49, a Yugoslav fighter aircraft 
 Miller Memorial Airpark, in Malheur County, Oregon, United States
 New Jersey Route 47, partially designated Route S49 until 1953
 S49: Keep only in the original container, a safety phrase
 , a submarine of the United States Navy
 S49, a postcode district in Chesterfield, England